A celebret (from the Latin celebret, "may he celebrate", the first word of the document) is a letter which, according to canon 903 of the 1983 Code of Canon Law, a Roman Catholic bishop or major religious superior gives to a priest in order that the priest may obtain permission in another diocese to say Mass, and for this purpose bears testimony that he is free from canonical censures.

History
The Council of Trent (Sess. XXIII, chap. xvi on Reform) lays down the rule that "no cleric who is a stranger shall without letter commendatory from his own ordinary be admitted by any bishop to celebrate the divine mysteries". Ordinarily permission is not to be given to a priest from another diocese to say Mass without this certificate signed and duly sealed.
 
The seal is obviously the more important requisite, as it is the safer guarantee against forgery. The celebret should be officially recognized by the diocesan authority of the place where a priest may wish to say Mass. One who has his celebret in due form, or who is certainly known to be in good standing in his own diocese, may be allowed to celebrate until he has had a sufficient time to comply with this rule. A priest with proper credentials cannot reasonably be prevented from saying Mass, though he will be expected to comply with reasonable restrictions which may be imposed.

In the U.S, the Third Plenary Council of Baltimore, as a regulation against collectors of funds for other dioceses or countries, enacted a decree (No. 295) that priests on such a mission should not be allowed to celebrate Mass even a single time until they had received permission from the ordinary. This rule has generally been enforced in diocesan synods.
 
The absence of the celebret does not suffice for the refusal of permission to say Mass, if persons worthy of belief bear positive testimony to the good standing of the priest. If the permission is unreasonably refused, the priest may say Mass privately, if no scandal is given. Yet the rectors of churches are not obliged to incur any expenses the celebration may involve. (S.C.C., 15 December 1703).

Sources
 Instruction Redemptionis Sacramentum (April 23, 2004), Chapter V, 111.

Sacramental law
Mass in the Catholic Church